Viachaslau Makaranka (born September 19, 1975) is a wrestler from Belarus who competed at the 2000 Summer Olympics and the 2004 Summer Olympics, winning a bronze medal at the latter.

References

External links
 

1975 births
Living people
Olympic wrestlers of Belarus
Wrestlers at the 2000 Summer Olympics
Wrestlers at the 2004 Summer Olympics
Olympic bronze medalists for Belarus
Olympic medalists in wrestling
Medalists at the 2004 Summer Olympics
Belarusian male sport wrestlers
20th-century Belarusian people
21st-century Belarusian people